Robert Hamilton (September 16, 1842 County of Argenteuil, Lower Canada - January 27, 1911 Saint Boniface, Manitoba) was a pioneer, politician and immigration agent. He served as an appointed member of the Council of the Northwest Territories from 1872 to 1876.

References

External links
Robert Hamilton biography

1842 births
1911 deaths
Members of the Legislative Assembly of the Northwest Territories
Mayors of places in Manitoba